RamanaickenPalayam is a village panchayat in the Salem district in the Indian state of Tamil Nadu.

Geography
Ramanaickenpalayam is surrounded by Pethanaickenpalayam towards west, Gangavalli Taluk towards South, Thalaivasal towards East, Kalrayan Hills towards North. Thammampatti, Namagiripettai, Thuraiyur, Rasipuram are the nearby cities.

The village is on the border of the Salem district and Viluppuram district. Kalrayan Hills are located north of the village.

A river known as "Vasishta Nadi", one of the longest rivers in Tamil Nadu, flows in this village which created a long delta region serving its agricultural needs and drinking purposes all over the area.

Geology  
The predominant soil in the village is black soil.

Demographics

Population 
The population of the town as per 2011 census by population of the town 19,678. It is located 56 km towards east of district headquarters Salem, and 283 km from the state capital Chennai.

Government and politics  
It is considered as a major village in Attur taluk.

Economy 
Agriculture is the main occupation in Ramanaickenpalayam. This village is known for its tapioca crop. Rice, cotton, turmeric and corn are grown as major commercial crops. Many people are working at spinning mills, and as drivers and coolies.

There are no banks in the village but the SBI - Zero Account balance opening office is available in this village.

Education 
There are three government schools are available in this village.

Tamil Angels Nursery and Primary School is in RamanaickenPalayam.

About the village 
RamanaickenPalayam is a village panchayat in the Salem district in the Indian state of Tamil Nadu. It is considered as a major village in Attur taluk. The population of the town as per 2011 census by population of the town 19,678. It is located 56 km towards east of district headquarters Salem, and 283 km from the state capital Chennai.

Agriculture is the main occupation in Ramanaickenpalayam. This village is known for its tapioca crop. Rice, cotton, turmeric and corn are grown as major commercial crops. The predominant soil in the village is black soil. Many people are working at spinning mills, and as drivers and coolies.

Ramanaickenpalayam is surrounded by Pethanaickenpalayam towards west, Gangavalli Taluk towards South, Thalaivasal towards East, Kalrayan Hills towards North. Thammampatti, Namagiripettai, Thuraiyur, Rasipuram are the nearby cities.

The village is on the border of the Salem district and Viluppuram district. Kalrayan Hills are located north of the village.

A river known as "Vasishta Nadi", one of the longest rivers in Tamil Nadu, flows in this village which created a long delta region serving its agricultural needs and drinking purposes all over the area.

A famous "Ponniamman Temple" is located in the banks of Vasishta Nadi which is the major religious centre in the village. A special pooja will be held at the temple on every full moon day midnight which is famous around the surrounding villages. Also there is Marriamman temple, Vinayagar and Iyyapan Temple and also a new Ponniamman temple (it is powerful deity of many families around there) was built in recent years by the great effort of the Dharmakatha of the village.

There are no banks in the village but the SBI - Zero Account balance opening office is available in this village.

There are three government schools are available in this village. It is very useful for Adhidravidhar people.

Tamil Angels Nursery and Primary School is in RamanaickenPalayam. It is one of the private schools and the correspondent name is Mr. A. Pandian. He is a very good teacher. He started his journey with 5+ students in the 1980s in a rental home and now there are 500+ students studying at the school. Also he built his own building. He is a strict teacher and he married at a later age. There are many students who came out from the school and leasing very good positions now. He is also a good singer.

Ramanayakan Palayam has Many important peoples in its history but One of the most  memorable important person, is who served his  best  for 22yrs as PANCHAYAT PRESIDENT contionusly WITHOUT ANY OPPOSITION, he also been as "DHARMAKARTHA" of the village.for the 22yrs. The name of the person is Mr.RANGASWAMY GOUNDER. and the village Ramanaicken palayam has many memorable stories. and recently the village also a grama seva centre.

References 

Villages in Salem district